Salatić is a Bosnian surname. Notable people with this surname include:

 Dušan Salatić (born 1929), professor and writer
 Vero Salatić (born 1985), Bosnian born Swiss footballer

Bosnian surnames
Serbian surnames